Prahl is a surname. Notable people with the surname include:

Axel Prahl (born 1960), German actor
Georg Prahl Harbitz (1802–1889), Norwegian priest and politician
Lita Prahl (1905–1978), Norwegian actress and costume designer
Martin Prahl, Swedish singer-songwriter
Norman Rudolph Prahl (1919-1996), American politician
Tom Prahl (born 1949), Swedish footballer and manager

See also
Prahl Crags, group of rock crags in Antarctica